In Arkansas folklore, the  Howler is a legendary creature said to dwell in the Ozarks. According to tradition, the creature is bear-like in shape with a gray colored, shaggy coat. In December 2015, the Arkansas television station 40/29 News reported that it had received photographs purported to be images of the creature from a viewer. The station contacted the Arkansas Game and Fish Commission, who responded that they had heard of no claims of sightings of the creature, and said that the images sent to the station were a hoax.

Call records to the Arkansas Game and Fish Commission during the fall of 2014 include a reported sighting of an animal in Benton County, Arkansas. In October 2014, a recorded emergency call received by the AGFC indicates a motorist nearly collided with an unidentified mammal at 9:45 PM. The recorded phone conversation indicates that armed state wildlife officers may have been dispatched to investigate what reports described as a bear-sized, gray, fast-running animal on Pump Station Road in Springdale.

References 

Arkansas folklore
2015 in Arkansas
2015 hoaxes
December 2015 events in the United States
American legendary creatures
Ozarks
Mythological bears